Argyrotaenia repertana is a species of moth of the family Tortricidae. It is found in North America, where it has been recorded from Maine, Manitoba, Massachusetts, New Brunswick, Nova Scotia, Quebec, Saskatchewan and Washington.

The wingspan is about 16–17 mm. Adults have been recorded on wing from May to August.

The larvae feed on Aralia species, Rhododendron canadense, Morella caroliniensis, Myrica gale, Aronia melanocarpa, Prunus pensylvanica and Salix species.

References

Moths described in 1944
repertana
Moths of North America